LSNB may refer to:

 Law Society of New Brunswick
 Lone Star National Bank